Thomas Edmund Dewey Jr. (October 2, 1932 – December 6, 2021) was a New York businessman and the elder son of the former governor of New York and two-time Republican presidential nominee, Thomas E. Dewey.

Career biography
Dewey earned a BA from Princeton University and an MBA from the Harvard Business School. He was a member of Dewey, Devlin, Metz & King LLC, which he helped to co-found in 1994. Prior to that, he was a member of McFarland Dewey & Co., a New York investment banking firm specializing in advisory and agency services for corporate and government clients. He joined the investment banking firm of Kuhn, Loeb & Co. after graduation in 1958 and was a member of the firm's executive committee when he retired to form his own firm in 1975. From then until 1989, he was president of Thomas E. Dewey Jr. & Co., Inc., a financial advisory services firm. Dewey was also on the Board of Trustees at The Scripps Research Institute. Dewey served Lenox Hill Hospital as an active Trustee beginning in 1959 and chairman Emeritus from 1993 until his death.  He also served as Vice Chairman of the New York City Housing Development Corporation from 1972 to 1989. He served in the United States Army

Family life and personal
In 1959, Dewey was married to the former Ann Reynolds Lawler and had three children:

References

External links
Thomas Dewey Jr's bio profile at People.Forbes.com

1932 births
2021 deaths
American bankers
Businesspeople from New York City
Military personnel from New York City
Princeton University alumni
Harvard Business School alumni
Scripps Research